Jubba Sahni (1906–1944) was an Indian freedom-fighter and revolutionary. He was born in a poor family in Minapur, Muzaffarpur district, Bengal Presidency, British India. A park and a railway station in Muzaffarpur were named Jubba Sahni Park and Jubba Sahni station as a tribute to him.

References

People from Bihar
1906 births
1944 deaths
People from Muzaffarpur district